Parvoscincus leucospilos, the white-spotted sphenomorphus, is a species of skink endemic to the Philippines. It is found between 300 and 1,200 m above sea levels in the forests of central and southern Sierra Madre Mountain Range (including Mount Banahaw) of Luzon Island. This skink hides under rocks or in debris in the banks of streams and rivers. When threatened by predators, such as snakes, it may dive and stay under water for a long time.

References

Parvoscincus
Endemic fauna of the Philippines
Reptiles of the Philippines
Reptiles described in 1872
Taxa named by Wilhelm Peters